Blejani may refer to several villages in Romania:

 Blejani, a village in the commune of Vedea, Argeș
 Blejani, a village in Scundu Commune, Vâlcea County